Drago Mamić (born February 9, 1954) is a Serbian-born Croatian retired football player and manager.

Managerial career
He last managed Bangladesh Premier League side Saif Sporting Club. He is also the former manager of Maldives. He has a UEFA 'Pro' Licence football coach. In September 2011, he was appointed as manager of Indonesia Super League team Persib Bandung. After six months and finishing in the 7th place he resigned from that club on 28 March 2012. He helped Churchill Brothers SC to win the IFA Shield.

References

External links
 
 Profile at goal.com
 

1954 births
Living people
Sportspeople from Valjevo
Association footballers not categorized by position
Yugoslav footballers
HNK Orijent players
NK Jadran Poreč players
Sabah F.C. (Malaysia) players
Lech Poznań players
Yugoslav expatriate footballers
Expatriate footballers in Malaysia
Expatriate footballers in Poland
Croatian football managers
HNK Orijent managers
Guangzhou F.C. managers
Sabah F.C. (Malaysia) managers
Myanmar national football team managers
Churchill Brothers FC Goa managers
Persib Bandung managers
Maldives national football team managers
Abahani Limited Dhaka managers
Drago Mamic
Saif SC managers
Croatian expatriate football managers
Expatriate football managers in China
Croatian expatriate sportspeople in China
Expatriate football managers in Malaysia
Croatian expatriate sportspeople in Malaysia
Expatriate football managers in Myanmar
Expatriate football managers in India
Croatian expatriate sportspeople in India
Expatriate football managers in Indonesia
Croatian expatriate sportspeople in Indonesia
Expatriate football managers in the Maldives
Croatian expatriate sportspeople in the Maldives
Expatriate football managers in Bangladesh
Expatriate football managers in Thailand
Croatian expatriate sportspeople in Thailand
Association football coaches